Ross Smith (born November 4, 1980) is a former Canadian soccer player and current broadcaster for the Portland Timbers, one of his former teams. Smith last played for Conference National side Ebbsfleet United.

Career

Youth and college
Smith attended E.C. Drury High School in Milton, Ontario, and played college soccer at the University of Rhode Island. He was named to the Verizon Academic all-District One team, earned third-team All-New England honors, and was also a first-team all-Atlantic 10 performer as a junior in 2001.

Professional
Smith moved across to the UK where he played with Montrose. Smith signed for Kent based Margate, playing a season there before being spotted and moving on to Gravesend & Northfleet playing in the English Conference National.

At the end of the 2006–07 season, Smith was out of contract and was considering a new contract offer from Ebbsfleet United and also interest from Stevenage Borough, when he had an offer to join Dagenham & Redbridge in League Two, who he eventually signed for in the summer of 2007.

Smith signed with the Rochester Rhinos of the USL First Division on June 18, 2008. He was reported not be eligible to play with the club until July 15, but was cleared by the authorities for his USL debut July 5, 2008, against the Vancouver Whitecaps FC.

On February 27, 2009, it was revealed that Smith's doctors detected a faulty heart valve which caused him to suffer an enlarging of his aorta, and as a result would require heart surgery, and would likely miss the entire 2009 USL1 season.

Smith signed for the Colorado Rapids of the MLS in January 2009, however the contract was terminated once doctors detected a problem with his heart, and he was forced to retire. Smith re-signed for Ebbsfleet United (previously known as Gravesend & Northfleet) in November 2009, after having surgery and being told by doctors it was safe to play again. In December, he said he was planning to leave Ebbsfleet to return to the United States.

On February 15, 2010, Smith signed with Portland Timbers. Following the season, and with the Timbers move to Major League Soccer, Smith ended his playing career, and on March 10, 2011 he was named as a radio analyst for Timbers home matches. On January 27, 2012, Smith resumed his playing career and signed with Ebbsfleet United for a third spell with the Kent club.  That ended in 2013 and since then he has been a TV analyst for all Timbers matches broadcast locally.

Personal life
Although born in Canada, both Smith's parents are Scottish-born giving him dual British and Canadian citizenship.

References

External links
Rhode Island bio

1980 births
Association football defenders
Canadian expatriate sportspeople in the United States
Canadian expatriate soccer players
Canadian people of Scottish descent
Canadian soccer players
Colorado Rapids players
National League (English football) players
Dagenham & Redbridge F.C. players
Ebbsfleet United F.C. players
Expatriate soccer players in the United States
Expatriate footballers in England
Living people
Margate F.C. players
Sportspeople from Guelph
Portland Timbers (2001–2010) players
Portland Timbers U23s players
Rochester New York FC players
Soccer people from Ontario
USL First Division players
USL League Two players
USSF Division 2 Professional League players
Rhode Island Rams men's soccer players
Canadian expatriate sportspeople in England